Garry Izrailevich Abelev (10 January 1928  23 December 2013) was a Russian scientist, Academician of the Russian Academy of Sciences (since 2000), Doctor of Biological Sciences, Honored Scientist of the Russian Federation (1998).
Laureate of the 1978 USSR State Prize.

Born and died in Moscow.
He graduated from the Department of Biochemistry of Plants at the Lomonosov Moscow State University.
He studied at the Moscow State University from 1945 to 1950.

In 1955 he defended his Candidate's Dissertation.
In 1963 he defended his doctoral dissertation.

He worked at the N.F. Gamaleya Federal Research Center for Epidemiology & Microbiology from  1950 to 1977.

Since 1977 he works at the N.N. Blokhin Russian Cancer Research Center.

From 1964 to 2006 he was lecturer at the Faculty of Biology at the Moscow State University.

In 1967 he received the title of Professor. He was a member of the Russian Academy of Natural Sciences (since 1990) and the New York Academy of Sciences.

References 

1928 births
2013 deaths
Russian immunologists
Full Members of the Russian Academy of Sciences
Honoured Scientists of the Russian Federation
Recipients of the USSR State Prize
Academic staff of Moscow State University
Moscow State University alumni
Employees of the Gamaleya Research Institute of Epidemiology and Microbiology
Cancer researchers
Soviet oncologists
Soviet immunologists